Puako is a census-designated place (CDP) in Hawaii County, Hawaii, United States. The population was 772 at the 2010 census, up from 429 at the 2000 census.

Geography
Puako is located on the west side of the island of Hawaii at  (19.967500, -155.846667). It is bordered to the west by the Pacific Ocean and to the east by Waikoloa Village. Hawaii Route 19 forms the eastern border of Puako and leads northeast  to Waimea and southwest  to Kailua-Kona.

Demographics

As of the census of 2000, there were 429 people, 215 households, and 118 families residing in the CDP. The racial makeup of the CDP was 71.56% White, 11.42% Asian, 4.43% Pacific Islander, and 12.59% from two or more races. Hispanic or Latino of any race were 3.26% of the population.

There were 215 households, out of which 14.9% had children under the age of 18 living with them, 42.3% were married couples living together, 7.9% had a female householder with no husband present, and 45.1% were non-families. 31.6% of all households were made up of individuals, and 4.7% had someone living alone who was 65 years of age or older.  The average household size was 2.00 and the average family size was 2.43.

In the CDP the population was spread out, with 11.7% under the age of 18, 4.9% from 18 to 24, 26.6% from 25 to 44, 41.7% from 45 to 64, and 15.2% who were 65 years of age or older.  The median age was 48 years. For every 100 females, there were 109.3 males.  For every 100 females age 18 and over, there were 111.7 males.

The median income for a household in the CDP was $60,250, and the median income for a family was $81,176. Males had a median income of $37,500 versus $31,250 for females. The per capita income for the CDP was $63,857.  None of the families and 3.1% of the population were living below the poverty line, including no under eighteens and 4.2% of those over 64.

See also
 The Fairmont Orchid
 Hokuloa Church (Puako)

References

Further reading
 Puakō: An Affectionate History

External links

Census-designated places in Hawaii County, Hawaii
Populated places on Hawaii (island)
Beaches of Hawaii (island)